Amalda aureus is a species of sea snail, a marine gastropod mollusk in the family Ancillariidae.

Description

Distribution

References

aureus
Gastropods described in 1990